Family Life is a 2017 Chilean drama film directed by Alicia Scherson and Cristián Jiménez. It was screened in the World Cinema Dramatic Competition section of the 2017 Sundance Film Festival.

Plot
A family goes on a trip and leaves their house and cat in the care of Martín, a distant cousin who is over forty years old and disappointed with life. Once settled in the house, he will try to conquer his attractive neighbor Paz, while inventing a fantastic life for himself.

Cast
 Jorge Becker as Martín
 Gabriela Arancibia as Paz
 Blanca Lewin as Consuelo
 Cristián Carvajal as Bruno

References

External links
 

2017 films
2017 drama films
2010s Spanish-language films
Chilean drama films
2010s Chilean films